Microthamniaceae is a family of green algae in the class Trebouxiophyceae. It is the only family in the order Microthamniales.

References

External links

Trebouxiophyceae families
Microthamniales